Edward Louis Halicki (born October 4, 1950) is an American former professional baseball player who pitched in the Major Leagues from 1974 to 1980. On August 24, 1975, Halicki threw a no-hitter for the San Francisco Giants against the New York Mets in a 6–0 victory. Halicki's no hitter was the last no-hit game by a Giants pitcher at home until Jonathan Sánchez's no-hit winning game on July 10, 2009. Halicki attended Kearny High School and Monmouth University. Halicki was primarily a starting pitcher (157 starts, 35 relief appearances) but on August 13, 1978, he recorded his only save at the MLB level against the arch rival Dodgers.  Halicki retired the only 2 batters he faced to preserve a 7–6 Giants victory.

See also

 List of Major League Baseball no-hitters

References

External links

1950 births
Living people
Baseball players from New Jersey
California Angels players
Decatur Commodores players
Fresno Giants players
Gold Coast Suns (baseball) players
Great Falls Giants players
Kearny High School (New Jersey) alumni
Major League Baseball pitchers
Monmouth Hawks baseball players
Monmouth Hawks men's basketball players
Phoenix Giants players
San Francisco Giants players
People from Kearny, New Jersey
Sportspeople from Hudson County, New Jersey
American men's basketball players